Hugh McKenzie (January 12, 1840 – October 3, 1893) was an Ontario farmer and political figure. He represented Lambton East in the Legislative Assembly of Ontario from 1890 to 1893 as a Liberal member.

He was born in Inverness-shire, Scotland in 1840 and came to East Williams Township, Middlesex County with his parents in 1848. The family later moved to Warwick. In 1864, he married Elizabeth Fraser. McKenzie died of typhoid fever in 1893, aged 53, while still in office and was buried in Watford.

External links 

The Canadian parliamentary companion, 1891 JA Gemmill
Lambton County's Hundred Years, 1849 - 1949, V Lauriston (1949)

1840 births
1893 deaths
Ontario Liberal Party MPPs
Scottish emigrants to Canada